Look Sharp! may refer to:

 Look Sharp! (Joe Jackson album), and the title song
 Look Sharp! (Roxette album)